Samoa Red Cross Society was founded in 1952 as branch of the New Zealand Red Cross Society. It was later closed, then reactivated in 1981. It has its headquarters in Apia.

External links
Official Samoa Red Cross Society Web Site
Samoa Red Cross Society Profile

Red Cross and Red Crescent national societies
Organizations established in 1952
Medical and health organisations based in Samoa
1952 establishments in Samoa